Jakšiai (formerly) is a village in Kėdainiai district municipality, in Kaunas County, in central Lithuania. According to the 2011 census, the village had a population of 138 people.

History
An ancient stone axe has been found in Jakšiai. There was a windmill during the Interwar Period. While under Soviet control, it was a subsidiary settlement of "Salomėja Nėris" kolkhoz.

Demography

References

Villages in Kaunas County
Kėdainiai District Municipality